Winkel is an unincorporated community in Tazewell County, Illinois, United States.

Notes

Unincorporated communities in Tazewell County, Illinois
Unincorporated communities in Illinois